The 2019 NorthPort Batang Pier season was the seventh season of the franchise in the Philippine Basketball Association (PBA).

Key dates

Draft picks

Roster

Philippine Cup

Eliminations

Standings

Game log

|-bgcolor=ccffcc
| 1
| January 16
| Blackwater
| W 117–91
| Robert Bolick (26)
| Lervin Flores (12)
| Anthony, Pringle (5)
| Smart Araneta Coliseum
| 1–0
|-bgcolor=ccffcc
| 2
| January 20
| NLEX
| W 95–90
| Sean Anthony (22)
| Moala Tautuaa (11)
| Sean Anthony (5)
| Smart Araneta Coliseum
| 2–0
|-bgcolor=ffcccc
| 3
| January 25
| Columbian
| L 100–110
| Stanley Pringle (29)
| Moala Tautuaa (12)
| Bolick, Pringle (6)
| Ynares Center
| 2–1

|-bgcolor=ffcccc
| 4
| February 8
| Rain or Shine
| L 100–107
| Stanley Pringle (34)
| Bradwyn Guinto (8)
| Bolick, Tautuaa (6)
| Mall of Asia Arena
| 2–2
|-bgcolor=ffcccc
| 5
| February 27
| Phoenix
| L 96–98
| Moala Tautuaa (22)
| Araña, Anthony (9)
| Moala Tautuaa (7)
| Smart Araneta Coliseum
| 2–3

|-bgcolor=ffcccc
| 6
| March 8
| Meralco
| L 111–121 (2OT)
| Stanley Pringle (33)
| Sean Anthony (16)
| Nico Elorde (6)
| Smart Araneta Coliseum
| 2–4
|-bgcolor=ffcccc
| 7
| March 10
| San Miguel
| L 107–113
| Moala Tautuaa (28)
| Moala Tautuaa (13)
| Stanley Pringle (9)
| Smart Araneta Coliseum
| 2–5
|-bgcolor=ffcccc
| 8
| March 20
| Magnolia
| L 90–103
| Sean Anthony (22)
| Moala Tautuaa (16)
| Stanley Pringle (5)
| Smart Araneta Coliseum
| 2–6
|-bgcolor=ccffcc
| 9
| March 24
| TNT
| W 109–83
| Stanley Pringle (27)
| Robert Bolick (12)
| Robert Bolick (7)
| Smart Araneta Coliseum
| 3–6
|-bgcolor=ccffcc
| 10
| March 27
| Alaska
| W 94–84
| Sean Anthony (24)
| Sean Anthony (17)
| Bolick, Tautuaa (5)
| Smart Araneta Coliseum
| 4–6

|-bgcolor=ccffcc
| 11
| April 3
| Barangay Ginebra
| W 100–97
| Robert Bolick (24)
| Stanley Pringle (7)
| Stanley Pringle (8)
| Smart Araneta Coliseum
| 5–6

Playoffs

Bracket

Game log

|-bgcolor=ffcccc
| 1
| April 7
| Rain or Shine
| L 85–91
| Moala Tautuaa (24)
| Stanley Pringle (11)
| Stanley Pringle (6)
| Mall of Asia Arena
| 0–1

Commissioner's Cup

Eliminations

Standings

Game log

|-bgcolor=ccffcc
| 1
| May 22
| Alaska
| W 103–81
| Sean Anthony (22)
| Prince Ibeh (13)
| Moala Tautuaa (6)
| Ynares Center
| 1–0
|-bgcolor=ccffcc
| 2
| May 25
| NLEX
| W 83–79
| Robert Bolick (18)
| Prince Ibeh (19)
| Elorde, Tautuaa (3)
| Smart Araneta Coliseum
| 2–0
|-bgcolor=ccffcc
| 3
| May 29
| TNT
| W 110–86
| Stanley Pringle (22)
| Prince Ibeh (20)
| Moala Tautuaa (6)
| Mall of Asia Arena
| 3–0

|-bgcolor=ffcccc
| 4
| June 1
| Barangay Ginebra
| L 70–73
| Moala Tautuaa (15)
| Prince Ibeh (24)
| Bolick, Elorde, Tautuaa (4)
| Mall of Asia Arena
| 3–1
|-bgcolor=ccffcc
| 5
| June 5
| San Miguel
| W 121–88
| Robert Bolick (25)
| Sean Anthony (12)
| Nico Elorde (9)
| Smart Araneta Coliseum
| 4–1
|-bgcolor=ccffcc
| 6
| June 12
| Magnolia
| W 102–99
| Sean Anthony (22)
| Prince Ibeh (13)
| Robert Bolick (9)
| Smart Araneta Coliseum
| 5–1
|-bgcolor=ccffcc
| 7
| June 19
| Rain or Shine
| W 107–105 (OT)
| Moala Tautuaa (34)
| Prince Ibeh (21)
| Robert Bolick (9)
| Mall of Asia Arena
| 6–1
|-bgcolor=ccffcc
| 8
| June 22
| Blackwater
| W 127–99
| Kevin Ferrer (23)
| Prince Ibeh (13)
| Robert Bolick (10)
| Cuneta Astrodome
| 7–1
|-bgcolor=ffcccc
| 9
| June 26
| Phoenix
| L 87–97
| Moala Tautuaa (19)
| Prince Ibeh (10)
| Sean Anthony (6)
| Smart Araneta Coliseum
| 7–2

|-bgcolor=ccffcc
| 10
| July 3
| Columbian
| W 110–108
| Moala Tautuaa (23)
| Prince Ibeh (15)
| Elorde, Tautuaa (6)
| Smart Araneta Coliseum
| 8–2
|-bgcolor=ccffcc
| 11
| July 12
| Meralco
| W 93–92
| Robert Bolick (18)
| Prince Ibeh (15)
| Nico Elorde (8)
| Cuneta Astrodome
| 9–2

Playoffs

Bracket

Game log

|-bgcolor=ffcccc
| 1
| July 21
| San Miguel
| L 84–98
| Robert Bolick (20)
| Prince Ibeh (13)
| Robert Bolick (6)
| Smart Araneta Coliseum
| 0–1
|-bgcolor=ffcccc
| 2
| July 24
| San Miguel
| L 88–90
| Garvo Lanete (22)
| Prince Ibeh (20)
| Robert Bolick (7)
| Smart Araneta Coliseum
| 0–2

Governors' Cup

Eliminations

Standings

Game log

|-bgcolor=ccffcc
| 1
| September 20
| Rain or Shine
| W 99–94
| Mychal Ammons (25)
| Mychal Ammons (19)
| Robert Bolick (5)
| Mall of Asia Arena
| 1–0
|-bgcolor=ffcccc
| 2
| September 27
| Magnolia
| L 80–96
| Ammons, Ferrer (18)
| Mychal Ammons (15)
| Robert Bolick (4)
| Smart Araneta Coliseum
| 1–1

|-bgcolor=ffcccc
| 3
| October 2
| Columbian
| L 108–114
| Robert Bolick (23)
| Moala Tautuaa (14)
| Robert Bolick (10)
| Smart Araneta Coliseum
| 1–2
|-bgcolor=ffcccc
| 4
| October 5
| Blackwater
| L 98–107
| Mychal Ammons (29)
| Mychal Ammons (17)
| Robert Bolick (8)
| Ynares Center
| 1–3
|-bgcolor=ffcccc
| 5
| October 9
| TNT 
| L 100–103 
| Garvo Lanete (23) 
| Mychal Ammons (13) 
| Anthony, Ammons, Bolick, Ferrer (4) 
| Cuneta Astrodome 
| 1–4
|-bgcolor=ccffcc
| 6
| October 12
| Phoenix
| W 80–70
| Moala Tautuaa (16)
| Moala Tautuaa (9)
| Sean Anthony (6)
| Smart Araneta Coliseum
| 2–4
|-bgcolor=ccffcc
| 7
| October 23
| San Miguel
| W 127–119
| Michael Qualls (40)
| Michael Qualls (18)
| Christian Standhardinger (7)
| Cuneta Astrodome
| 3–4

|-bgcolor=ffcccc
| 8
| November 3
| Alaska
| L 99–106
| Christian Standhardinger (37)
| Christian Standhardinger (16)
| Nico Elorde (7)
| Smart Araneta Coliseum
| 3–5
|-bgcolor=ffcccc
| 9
| November 10
| Meralco
| L 89–103
| Michael Qualls (27)
| Michael Qualls (10)
| Sean Anthony (8)
| Ynares Center
| 3–6
|-bgcolor=ccffcc
| 10
| November 13
| NLEX
| W 102–94
| Michael Qualls (36)
| Christian Standhardinger (19)
| Michael Qualls (5)
| Smart Araneta Coliseum
| 4–6
|-bgcolor=ccffcc
| 11
| November 17
| Barangay Ginebra
| W 98–96
| Michael Qualls (30)
| Michael Qualls (13)
| Sean Anthony (6)
| Smart Araneta Coliseum
| 5–6

Playoffs

Bracket

Awards

References

NorthPort Batang Pier seasons
NorthPort Batang Pier